Chen Sing-an (born in 1962) is a Taiwanese football manager. He had managed Chinese Taipei national football team.

As a player, Chen had played for Flying Camel and Chinese Taipei for 10 years, from 1982 to 1992. He scored a goal against New Zealand in the 1986 FIFA World Cup qualifying rounds.

He retired from playing in 1993 and took the position of Flying Camel's head coach till 2001. Later, he managed Chinese Taipei national under-23 football team from 1999 to 2000. He became Chinese Taipei senior team's Head Coach in 2008 and then Chinese Taipei U-15's Head Coach in 2011.

References

1962 births
Living people
Taiwanese footballers
Taiwanese football managers
Chinese Taipei national football team managers

Association footballers not categorized by position